Éric Guichard is a French cinematographer.

Selected filmography 
 1986: Polvere di stelle by Agnès Merlet
 1987: Il était une fois dix neuf acteurs (TV)
 1993: Doudou perdu
 1993: Latcho Drom
 1995: Post-scriptum
 1995: Mondo
 1996: Rainbow pour Rimbaud
 1996: Le Vent de l'oubli (TV)
 1996: Méfie-toi de l'eau qui dort
 1997: Tortilla y cinema
 1997: Gadjo Dilo 
 1998: Het ondergrondse orkest
 1998: Tueurs de petits poissons
 1999: D'ailleurs, Derrida
 1999: Fleurs de sel (TV)
 1999: La Femme de plume (TV)
 1999: Himalaya : L'Enfance d'un chef
 1999: Je suis né d'une cigogne
 2000: La Squale
 2001: Intimisto
 2001: La Fille de son père
 2001: 17 rue Bleue
 2002: Les Diables
 2003: Fureur
 2003: Vacances mortelles (TV)
 2004: Terre et cendres (Khakestar-o-khak)
 2005: Quelques jours en avril (TV)
 2005: Le Cactus
 2006: La Piste (The Trail)
 2006: Paris, je t'aime
 2006: Une naissance
 2007: J'veux pas que tu t'en ailles
 2007: Enfances
 2007: Divine Émilie (TV)
 2008: L'Empreinte de l'ange by Safy Nebbou
 2008: La Possibilité d'une île by Michel Houellebecq
 2009: L'École du pouvoir (TV) by Raoul Peck
 2009: Erreur de la banque en votre faveur by Gérard Bitton and Michel Munz
 2009: Pour un fils by Alix De Maistre
 2009: Moloch Tropical by Raoul Peck (TV)
 2010: L'amour c'est mieux à deux by Dominique Farrugia and Arnaud Lemort
 2012: Dans la tourmente by Christophe Ruggia
 2012: Plan de table by Christelle Raynal
 2012: Dépression et des potes by Arnaud Lemort
 2013: Belle and Sebastian by Nicolas Vanier
 2013: La voix des steppes by Ermek Shinarbaev
 2014: Murder in Pacot by Raoul Peck
 2016: Les Saisons by Jacques Perrin
 2017: L'école buissonnière by Nicolas Vanier

External links 
 
 On the site of the AFC (French Society of Cinematographers)
 Biography on Africultures

Living people
French cinematographers
César Award winners
Year of birth missing (living people)